Federico "Freddy" Curci (born October 30, 1962) is a Canadian singer and songwriter. He was lead vocalist for the rock band Sheriff and later founded and became frontman for the band Alias, a position he retains to this day.

Curci provided lead vocals on the Sheriff song "When I'm with You", which reached the number one spot in 1989, and the Alias power ballad "More Than Words Can Say", which reached the number two spot in 1990 on the Billboard charts.

BMI presented Curci with the Million-airs award for "More Than Words Can Say". According to BMI's website, only 1,500 songs have achieved Million-air status (one million air plays) among the 4.5 million songs by 300,000 BMI represented artists. One million performances is the equivalent of approximately 50,000 broadcast hours, or more than 5.7 years of continuous airplay.

In January 2009, Alias announced the release of their long delayed second album, Never Say Never, which was recorded in 1992 but not released due to the rapidly evolving music scene of that time where grunge was the new rage and metal was out. A few of the songs from this "lost" album were re-recorded and appeared on Curci's solo album Dreamer's Road, but the rest remained unreleased.

Early influences 
Of Italian descent, Curci grew up in Toronto. At an early age Curci listened mostly to classical opera music. He started listening to Black Sabbath and other rock music in his teenage years. Aside from opera music, some of Curci's musical influences were Lou Gramm of Foreigner and Tom Johnston of The Doobie Brothers.

Before Sheriff, Curci performed in Italian wedding bands in Toronto.

Songwriting career 
As a Billboard top 10 hit songwriter, Curci co-wrote with his Sheriff and Alias bandmate Steve DeMarchi the number 2 hit song "More Than Words Can Say", and the Hot Mainstream Rock Tracks number 18 hit song "Haunted Heart". He also co-wrote most of the songs on the Alias album, his solo album Dreamer's Road and the Zion album.

Curci is also a songwriter for the motion picture industry. In 2007, Curci's songs were featured in several episodes of the Lifetime's Army Wives. Curci was the primary composer for the sitcom Two Guys and a Girl (2000–2001), and also wrote the title theme.

In addition to DeMarchi, accomplished writers Curci has collaborated with include Brett Walker; Jeff Paris; Romina Arena; Jason Hook; his wife, Lara Cody; F. Grossi; Donny Hackett and Douglas Vallance.

Discography 
With Sheriff
Sheriff (1982), Capitol
Sheriff Live (1983), Capitol (Promo Only)

With Alias
Alias (1990), EMI
Haunted Heart (1990, EP), EMI
Waiting for Love (1991, EP), EMI
Perfect World (1992, EP), EMI
Never Say Never (2009), EMI

Solo albums
Dreamer's Road (1994), EMI
Then & Now (2000), EMI, Frontiers (Italy)

Compilation inclusions
The Boys of Summer (1994), EMI

With Zion
Zion (2006), Frontiers

With Who's Your Daddy!
Who's Your Daddy! (2010), WYD Records
Paternity Suit (2012), WYD Records
Anti-Social Security (2015), WYD Records

Singles with Alias

Filmography 
1991 Don't Tell Mom the Babysitter's Dead Soundtrack: Performer / Producer "Perfect World"
1999 Two Guys and a Girl and a Pizza Place : Au Revoir Pizza Place (#3.2) Primary Composer
1999 Two Guys and a Girl and a Pizza Place (#3.4) Primary Composer
2006 Metal Mania: Stripped Across America Live
2007 Army Wives: After Birth (#1.2) TV Episode [Soundtrack] Songwriter / Performer:  "Whatcha Tryin' To Do" and "Echoes in the Darkness"
2007 Army Wives: Independence Day (#1.5) TV Episode [Soundtrack] Songwriter / Performer: "Home"
2007 Army Wives: Only The Lonely (#1.8) TV Episode [Soundtrack] Songwriter / Performer "Crazy Day" and "Carrie"

Footnotes

Citations

References 
  Freddy Curci interview, Strutter Magazine
 "Billboard". Billboard Hot 100 airplay and sales charts. Retrieved 2006-06-11
 Feldman, Christopher (2000). The Billboard Book of Number Two Hits. 
 BMI Website
 Sheriff Album review, written by Robert Lunte, author of Four Pillars of Singing, Amazon.com
 A Freddy Curci Telephone Interview, www.melodicrock.com

External links 
 Freddy Curci (archived copy)
 Freddy Curci Myspace Profile
 

1962 births
Canadian hard rock musicians
Canadian male singer-songwriters
Canadian singer-songwriters
Canadian people of Italian descent
Living people
Musicians from Toronto
Place of birth missing (living people)
Alias (band) members
Sheriff (band) members